Slow Fuse is the second album by Little Axe, released on September 30, 1996 by Wired Recordings. The album was re-issued as a digital download in 2014 featuring additional tracks.

Track listing

Personnel 

Musicians
Saz Bell – vocals
Scott Firth – bass guitar
Bernard Fowler – vocals
Kevin Gibbs – vocals
Alan Glen – harmonica
Keith LeBlanc – drums
Skip McDonald – vocals, guitar, keyboards, producer
Tom McManamon – banjo, mandolin
Talvin Singh – tabla
Doug Wimbish – bass guitar

Technical personnel
Adrian Sherwood – producer

Release history

References

External links 
 

1996 albums
Albums produced by Adrian Sherwood
Little Axe albums